Monty Python's The Meaning of Life is the third and final soundtrack album by Monty Python, released in 1983 alongside their last film. Billed as "The only soundtrack album to be introduced by live fish! (apart from some copies of 'Shane')", it consists of sketches and songs from the film, with a few links performed by Michael Palin and a brief appearance from Terry Gilliam.

The album features dialogue which didn't make it into the final cut of the film as well as additional sound effects to help with the audio medium. "The Adventures of Martin Luther" sequence is introduced but does not appear. The sketch itself was excised from the final cut of the film but was eventually  reinstated 20 years later for the DVD "Director's Cut", although it did feature in the illustrated script book which accompanied the film's release. The film's songs are included in full, with "Christmas In Heaven" having a longer fade-out than appears in the film.

The original UK vinyl release had the traditional George Peckham messages etched on the runout grooves. The first side read: "GADZOOKS!!! NO TIME LEFT. TURN OVER FOR "THE MEANING OF LIFE" NOW. ALL WILL BE REVEALED", with the second reading "NO FISH ADDITIVES USED WHATSOEVER, SEE COVER FOR FURTHER DETAILS OF PHILOSOPHY LPS". The back cover did indeed contain a short list of spoof philosophy LPs, alongside a similarly comic profile of the Python team members.

In the UK the album was accompanied by a 7" single (A 3495) on 27 June 1983 comprising Galaxy Song/Every Sperm Is Sacred, the latter song containing an extra instrumental section not featured in the film or album version. This was also available as a fish bowl-shaped picture disc.

The 2006 Special Edition includes bonus tracks which included demos, unused song ideas and radio promos.

Track listing

Side one
Introduction
Fish Introduction
The Meaning of Life 
The Miracle of Birth
Link (Frying Eggs)
The Third World (Yorkshire)
Every Sperm Is Sacred
Protestant Couple
Link (Martin Luther)
Growth and Learning
Fighting Each Other
Link (The Great Tea of 1914-18)
Fish Link

Side two
Terry Gilliam Intro
Accountancy Shanty
Zulu Wars
Middle Age
Live Organ Transplants
Galaxy Song
Penis Song (The Not Noël Coward Song)
The Autumn Years
Death
Christmas in Heaven
Dedication to Fish

Bonus tracks on 2006 reissue

Intro Title Song Demo Meaning of Life (Piano Version) 
Alternate Intro Title Song Meaning of Life (Band Version)
Fat Song (Deleted Intro to Mr Creosote Sketch) 
Alternate Christmas In Heaven Song
Radio Ad - Philosophers Corner
Radio Ad - Officer
Radio Ad - German Translation
Greasy Hair
Dino Viccotti
Stretch The Script
Grand Prix
Hard Of Thinking

Charts

Critical reception
Al Campbell of AllMusic gave the album three and a half out of five stars and wrote that "Unlike most comedy releases, the soundtrack of Monty Python's The Meaning of Life is an appealing audio souvenir that doesn't get stale after listening to it a few times." noting that "[this is] because of the incredibly catchy and satirical songs from the film, which are all included".

Accolades

Grammy Awards

References

External links

Meaning of Life
1983 soundtrack albums
MCA Records soundtracks
Musical film soundtracks
Comedy film soundtracks